Riazzino railway station is a railway station in the municipality of Locarno, in the Swiss canton of Ticino. It is an intermediate stop on the standard gauge Giubiasco–Locarno line of Swiss Federal Railways.

Services 
 the following services stop at Riazzino:

References

External links 
 
 

Railway stations in Ticino
Swiss Federal Railways stations
Railway stations in Switzerland opened in 2008